Evergreen: The Road to Legalization is a 2013 documentary film directed by Riley Morton about the U.S. state of Washington's passage of an initiative decriminalizing recreational cannabis. The film was written by Nils Cowan and features defense lawyer Doug Hiatt, American Civil Liberties Union lawyer Alison Holcomb, Pete Holmes, John McKay, initiative opponent Steve Sarich, and Rick Steves.

References

External links
 
 

2013 films
2013 in cannabis
American documentary films about cannabis
Cannabis in Washington (state)
Documentary films about cannabis
Documentary films about the Pacific Northwest
2010s English-language films
2010s American films